William Henry Burt (February 22, 1876 - November 21, 1940) was a career United States Army officer who served as a brigadier general throughout World War I.

Early life 
Burt was born in Provincetown, Massachusetts. He graduated from Taunton High School in Taunton, Massachusetts in 1893.  Burt received an A.B. degree from the University of Vermont in 1898. Later that year he enlisted for the Spanish–American War as a corporal in Company M, 1st Vermont Infantry Regiment.

Military career 
Burt was commissioned a second lieutenant in the 43rd United States Volunteer Infantry in September 1899. He received a regular army commission in the artillery corps on July 1, 1901, and he graduated from the Artillery School in 1904. When the artillery was divided into Field and Coastal Artillery in 1907, Briggs was assigned to the 21st Field Artillery Brigade.

Briggs remained in that unit until 1918, when he was transferred to the Fourth Field Artillery Brigade. He was in that unit until his promotion to brigadier general on August 8, 1918. He served in France for eighteen months during the war. He was discharged as a brigadier general on March 10, 1919.

After being discharged Briggs transferred to the Finance Department. In the month of July 1920 he transferred to Field Artillery and became a colonel. In 1920 he graduated from the School of the Line, and in 1921 he graduated from the General Staff School. Briggs graduated from the Army War College in 1924, and in 1932 he was on duty as field artillery officer in the Seventh Corp's Area headquarters in Chicago, Illinois. The remainder of his active service was served in the Inspector General's Department, serving in California, Mississippi, Kansas, South Carolina, and Texas. On September 30, 1934 Briggs retired as a brigadier general due to disabilities.

Death and burial
Burt was visiting his brother-in-law Dr. Sidney Bunker when he died in Westwood, Massachusetts, on November 21, 1940.  He was buried at Arlington National Cemetery.

Family
In 1901, Burt married Ethelyn Marie Bunker (1879-1934) in Burlington, Vermont.  They were the parents of daughter Ruth (1902-1938), who was the wife of Army officer Robert Tappan Chaplin.

References

Bibliography 
Davis, Henry Blaine. Generals in Khaki. Raleigh, NC: Pentland Press, 1998.  

United States Army generals
People from Provincetown, Massachusetts
University of Vermont alumni
United States Army personnel of World War I
1876 births
1940 deaths
Burials at Arlington National Cemetery
Military personnel from Massachusetts